June Elaine Rita Maston (later Ferguson; 14 March 1928 – 3 December 2004) was an Australian sprinter and athletics coach from New South Wales. In 1948 she placed fourth in the Australian national championships over 100 yards.

At the 1948 Summer Olympics in London she won a silver medal in 4 x 100 metres relay with teammates Shirley Strickland, Joyce King and Elizabeth McKinnon. She had earlier competed in the women's long jump event, but did not qualify for the final. At the Olympics she met her future husband, water polo player Jack Ferguson.

Later, she became an athletics coach.  Her most successful charges included four-time Olympic sprint champion Betty Cuthbert and Olympic 80 metres hurdles champion Maureen Caird.

Maston had five children: Jeremy, Ian, Fiona, Megan, and Debra.

References

External links
 
 
 
 

1928 births
2004 deaths
Australian female sprinters
Australian athletics coaches
Olympic female sprinters
Olympic athletes of Australia
Olympic silver medalists for Australia
Olympic silver medalists in athletics (track and field)
Athletes (track and field) at the 1948 Summer Olympics
Medalists at the 1948 Summer Olympics
Sportswomen from New South Wales
Sport Australia Hall of Fame inductees
People from Tweed Heads, New South Wales